Tom, Dick and Harry is a 1941 comedy film directed by Garson Kanin, written by Paul Jarrico, and starring Ginger Rogers, George Murphy, Alan Marshal, Phil Silvers, and Burgess Meredith. It was released by RKO Radio Pictures.

Rogers was working on the film when she was awarded the Oscar as Best Actress for her 1940 performance in Kitty Foyle. It was her first film released after her Oscar win.

It was remade as The Girl Most Likely (1957), a musical which was also the last film released by RKO.

Plot
Janie (Ginger Rogers) is a telephone operator and a daydreamer. Her fondest wish is to land a rich husband. She has a boyfriend, Tom (George Murphy), a car salesman, who wants to get married, which results in Janie dreaming about what their life together would be like.

Listening in on a long-distance phone call between the wealthiest eligible bachelor in town, Dick Hamilton (Alan Marshal), and the girl Dick has been dating, Janie makes a wish that she could meet him. When an expensive car pulls alongside her that instant, Janie takes it as her wish being granted. Turns out it is garage mechanic Harry (Burgess Meredith), driving it to be repaired.

Harry is immediately smitten. He spends time with Janie, kisses her and proposes marriage. Janie's head is spinning and she daydreams about being a mechanic's wife.

Disconnecting a call, Janie causes a quarrel between Dick and his girl. She ends up meeting Dick and falling for him. Tom and Harry are waiting for her, leading Janie to declare that she's engaged to all three. A dream of being Dick's wealthy wife causes her to choose him, but at the last minute, a kiss from Harry changes her mind one last time.

Cast
 Ginger Rogers as Janie
 George Murphy as Tom
 Alan Marshal as Dick
 Burgess Meredith as Harry
 Phil Silvers as Ice Cream Vendor
 Joe Cunningham as Father
 Jane Seymour as Mother 
 Lenore Lonergan as Butch (Janie's sister)
 Vickie Lester as Paula (Vickie Lester)
 Betty Breckenridge as Gertrude

Reception 
The film earned a profit of $234,000. On Rotten Tomatoes, the film has an aggregate score of 100% based on 5 critic reviews.

References

External links
 
 
 
 

1941 films
1941 romantic comedy films
American romantic comedy films
1940s English-language films
American black-and-white films
Films scored by Roy Webb
Films directed by Garson Kanin
RKO Pictures films
1940s American films